KNN may refer to:

 k-nearest neighbors algorithm (k-NN), a method for classifying objects
 Nearest neighbor graph (k-NNG), a graph connecting each point to its k nearest neighbors
 Kabataan News Network, a Philippine television show made by teens
 Khanna railway station, in Khanna, Punjab, India (by Indian Railways code)
 Kings Norton railway station, in Birmingham, England (by National Rail code)
 Knighton News Network, the recurring TV station which hosts the news recap by Herb Herbertson at the beginning of every episode of Nexo Knights
 Konkani language, spoken in the Konkan coast of India (by ISO 639-3 language code)
 Korea New Network, broadcast television in South Korea
 Kurdish News Network, news television network in Iraqi Kurdistan
 Kankan Airport, Guinea (by IATA airport code)